Karl Hanisch (20 January 1900 – 5 March 1957) was an Austrian Olympic fencer. He competed in the individual and team épée and team sabre events at the 1936 Summer Olympics.

References

External links
 

1900 births
1957 deaths
Austrian male épée fencers
Olympic fencers of Austria
Fencers at the 1936 Summer Olympics
Austrian male sabre fencers